Pee Wee is a name or nickname for:

People
 Randy "Pee Wee" Anderson (1959–2002), American wrestling referee
 John Howell Collier (1899–1980), United States Army lieutenant general
 Pee Wee Crayton (1914–1985), American R&B and blues guitarist and singer
 Thomas "Pee Wee" DePhillips, a capo in the Genovese crime family
 Alfred "Pee Wee" Ellis (born 1941), American saxophonist, composer and arranger
 Pee Wee Erwin (1913–1981), American jazz trumpeter
 Peewee Ferris, Australian DJ
 "Pee Wee", nickname of Jack Forsythe (c. 1882–1957), American college football player and coach
 Pee Wee, nickname of Donald Henry Gaskins (1933–1991), American serial killer
 Pee-Wee, nickname of Dave Herman (born 1984), American martial arts fighter
 Pee Wee Hunt (1907–1979), American jazz trombonist, vocalist and band leader
 Pee Wee, nickname of Shannon Johnson (born 1974), former Women's National Basketball Association player
 Pee Wee King (1914–1999), American country music singer-songwriter
 Pee Wee Kirkland (born 1945), former street basketball player
 Pee Wee Lambert (1924–1965), American mandolinist
 Peewee Longway (born 1984), American rapper
 Pee Wee Marquette (1914–1992), American master of ceremonies at the Birdland jazz club
 Pee Wee Moore (1928–2009), American jazz saxophonist
 Pee Wee Reese (1918–1999), Hall of Fame baseball player
 Pee Wee Russell (1906–1969), American jazz musician
 Pee Wee Smith (born 1968), Canadian footballer
 Clifford 'Pee Wee' Trahan (1938–2016), American country singer
 Pee-Wee Wanninger (1902–1981), Major League Baseball player
 Pee Wee Wentz (born 1941), retired NASCAR Winston Cup Series driver
 Leon "Pee Wee" Whittaker (1906–1993), African American musician

Fictional characters
 Pee-Wee Harris, a character in several series of boy's books by Percy Keese Fitzhugh and a comic strip
 Pee-wee Herman, a character created and portrayed by Paul Reubens
 Edward "Pee Wee" Morris, a character in the film Porky's and its two sequels

See also
 Peewit (pronounced "Pee-Wee"), a character in the comic series Johan and Peewit and the animated TV series The Smurfs

Lists of people by nickname